The 2018–19 season was Derby County's eleventh consecutive season in the Championship in their 135th year in existence. Along with competing in the Championship, the club also participated in the FA Cup and EFL Cup. This season was Frank Lampard's sole full season as Derby County manager following Gary Rowett's move to Stoke City.

The season covers the period from 1 July 2018 to 30 June 2019.

Competitions

Pre-season friendlies
The Rams revealed friendlies against Notts County, Mansfield Town, Southampton, Coventry City and Wolverhampton Wanderers.

Championship

League table

Results by matchday

Result summary

Matches
On 21 June 2018, the league fixtures were announced.

Play-offs

EFL Cup

On 15 June 2018, the draw for the first round was made in Vietnam. The second round draw was made from the Stadium of Light on 16 August, with the third round draw made on 30 August. The draw for the fourth round took place on 29 September, broadcast live on the Quest highlights show EFL on Quest.

FA Cup

The third round draw was made live on BBC by Ruud Gullit and Paul Ince from Stamford Bridge on 3 December 2018. The fourth round draw was made live on BBC by Robbie Keane and Carl Ikeme from Wolverhampton on 7 January 2019. The fifth round draw was broadcast on 28 January 2019 live on BBC; Alex Scott and Ian Wright conducted the draw.

Statistics

Most Common First XI

Appearances and goals
Last updated on 27 May 2019

|-
! colspan=14 style=background:#dcdcdc; text-align:center| Goalkeepers

|-
! colspan=14 style=background:#dcdcdc; text-align:center| Defenders

|-
! colspan=14 style=background:#dcdcdc; text-align:center| Midfielders

|-
! colspan=14 style=background:#dcdcdc; text-align:center| Forwards

|-
! colspan=14 style=background:#dcdcdc; text-align:center| Players transferred or loaned out during the season

|}

Goals record

Transfers

Transfers in

Transfers out

Loans in

Loans out

References

Derby County
Derby County F.C. seasons